"Blue Moon" is a song recorded by South Korean boy group BtoB, for their eleventh extended play, This Is Us (2018), which was released on June 18, 2018 by Cube Entertainment. As the fourth track on the album, it was written by Minhyuk, Peniel and Ilhoon, and was produced by Minhyuk, Yang Seunguk and Yun Gukhyeong.

"Blue Moon (Cinema Ver.)" is an alternative version of the song for survival show, Kingdom: Legendary War which was released on June 13, 2021. This song was selected as the most wanted stage by fans in the show.

Background and release
On May 26, 2021, Mnet's released a 45-second teaser of the second part of the third round, No Limit stage, between BtoB and SF9. In the video released, BtoB was seen in the recording studio discussing their next concept, Eunkwang suggests a stage inspired by a jazz bar. Changsub explains that his military seniors all play instruments and says recruit them to be the group’s live band. On the day of the broadcast, May 27, Max Changmin revealed that Btob is the third team in the 3rd round and had chosen their song that had never been performed on air. Minhyuk had a difficult time choosing songs, saying, "It gives us complete freedom, so the scope of what we can do is limitless." Changsub suggested, "It is our strength that the range that we can do is limitless or no limit, so let's do what Melody wants to hear." Eunkwang said, "There is a place I want to see the most in the kingdom," and said that we should do 'Blue Moon'. 

On June 11, Cube Entertainment released the artwork image of the digital single "Blue Moon (Cinema Ver.)" across all the group's social media accounts. The released artwork shows a man and a woman holding hands and dancing under the neon 'Blue Moon', creating an atmosphere like a poster for a musical movie. The song was released to carry on the deep impression and lingering impression shown in the show.

The song was released digitally on June 13, 2021, through several music portals, including Melon, Apple Music, and Spotify.

Music
The original version of "Blue Moon" is composed in the key of A minor, 100 beats per minute with a running time of 4:01 minutes. For "Blue Moon (Cinema Version)", the song is composed in the key of C♯ minor, 100 beats per minute with a running time of 4:24 minutes. It has a deeper jazz feel than the original song, ranging from Broadway-style big band swings to funky jazz and bebop jazz.

Critical reception
Han Soo-jin, writing for IZE magazine praised BtoB for their 10 years existence in the industry and their message of hope to their short-lived colleagues. She also wrote about "Blue Moon" performance, "As seen in a musical, it showed a stage of determination that was different from before with a spectacular stage use and dramatic narrative. Those who seemed to be competing only with vocals made them realize the potential of their 10th year with a challenging aspect that felt catharsis of novelty while saving their organs. In an interview dated on June 11, Kingdom's main director Lee Young-joo PD chose "Blue Moon" stage as one of the most memorable stages: "It was a stage that showed BtoB's great determination to prepare a competition with a non-famous B-side song in the competition program, and showed a witty performance with the La La Land concept. And it was a performance that was dedicated to Melodys who supported BtoB, that left a deep impression.

Live performance
On the 9th episode of Kingdom: Legendary War, the group performed "Blue Moon (Cinema Version)" for the first time with (G)I-dle's Miyeon as a hidden card to help BtoB's No Limit stage. The stage was presented as a musical movie-like stage with the concept of the movie La La Land and Once Upon a Time in Hollywood with Peniel's piano performance and Miyeon's role caught in a love storyline between Minhyuk and Changsub. 

After the stage, they received praises from contestants saying, "What can't these hyungs do?", "It's really cool." and "It was a stage with a perfect texture." iKon's Bobby commented, "I didn't reveal it, but it's fatal to be this sexy. If it were a woman, I'd already had a love letter." What can't these hyungs do?" and "It's really cool." BtoB placed third in the round with cumulative points of 3,314.303, behind SF9 and Stray Kids.

Track listing
This Is Us

Digital single
 "Blue Moon (Cinema Version)" – 4:24

Credits and personnel

Cinema version
Credits are adapted from Melon.

 BtoB
Minhyuk (HUTA) – Composing, songwriting
Peniel – Songwriting
Ilhoon – Songwriting
 AFTRSHOK – Composing, audio engineer
 Joseph K– Composing
 GEIST WAY – audio engineer, keyboard
 Byeon Jang-mun – Background vocal 
 Ahn Byung-beom – Drum
 Kim Ki-seong – Bass
 Ken Song – Guitar
 Kim Yu-mi – Piano
 Choi Ye-ji  – Record engineering
 Kim Seong-ryeol  – Record engineering
 Jeong Yura – Digital editor
 Mr. Cho  – Audio mixing
 Kwon Nam-woo  – Audio mastering
 Jang Seung-ho  – Assistant audio mastering

Charts

Original version

Cinema version

Release history

References 

BtoB songs
2018 singles
2018 songs
Cube Entertainment singles
Korean-language songs
Songs written by Jung Il-hoon
2021 singles
2021 songs